Shatabdi Wadud is a Bangladeshi film and television actor. He won Bangladesh National Film Award in Best Actor in a Negative Role for his role in the film Guerrilla (2011).

Career
In 1985 Wadud joined a drama club Artonad. He joined theatre troupe Theatre Centre in 1991 and Prachyanat in 1997. His debut performance in television was in Shonkito Podojatra.

Works

Films

Television 
 Sakin Sarisuri (2009-2010)
 Bishaash (2010-2011)
 Ice Cream (2013)
 Trump Card (2013)
 The Singing Teacher (2014)
 Bodh (2015)
 Daag (2017)
 Chabial Reunion (2017)
 Tin Pagoler Holo Mela (2017)
 Oshomvabito: Unforeseen (2017)
 Made in Bangladesh (2019)
 Game Over (2019)
 Eka (2020)
 Troll (2020)
 Mashrafe Junior (2021; Present)
 Zindabahar (2022)

Web series 

{| class="wikitable sortable" style="background:#F5F5F5;"
! Year
! Title
! OTT
! Character
! Co-Artist
! Director
! Notes
|-
| 2017 || Feluda - Ghurgutiar Ghotona ||Bioscope || ||Parambrata Chatterjee, Riddhi Sen || ||
|-
| rowspan="2" | 2020 ||Ekattor ||Hoichoi||Prodip ||Tisha, Mithila, Iresh Zaker, Mostafizur Noor Imran, Tariq Anam Khan ||Tanim Noor ||
|-
| August 14 ||Binge ||Khaled || Tasnuva Tisha, Shahiduzzaman Selim, Monira Mithu, Tanvir, Shawon || Shihab Shaheen  ||Binge Original Web Series 
|-
| rowspan="4" | 2022 || Nikhoj||Chorki || ||Shilpi Sarkar Apu, Afsana Mimi, Intekhab Dinar, Shamol Mawla, Khairul Basar, Dipannita Martin, Orchita Sporshia ||Reehan Rahman ||
|-
|Kaiser
|Hoichoi
|
|
|
|
|-
| Syndicate||Chorki || Sohail ||||Shihab Shaheen ||
|-
| Karagar||Hoichoi || Father Alfred ||||Syed Ahmed Shawki ||
|}

 Short film 
 Ekjon Telapoka'' (2020)

References

External links
 

Living people
Bangladeshi male film actors
Bangladeshi male stage actors
 
Year of birth missing (living people)